The Stirrup Cup Sensation is a 1924 British silent sports film directed by Walter West and starring Violet Hopson, Stewart Rome, and Cameron Carr.

Cast
 Violet Hopson as Eileen Chelverley  
 Stewart Rome as Honorable Jack Bellenden  
 Cameron Carr as Paul Frensham  
 Judd Green as Lord Bellenden  
 Fred Hearne as Arthur Rowlandson  
 Bob Vallis as Nat Monday  
 James Strackey as Joyce

References

Bibliography
 Low, Rachael. The History of the British Film 1918-1929. George Allen & Unwin, 1971.

External links
 

1924 films
1920s sports films
British horse racing films
British silent feature films
Films directed by Walter West
Films set in England
British black-and-white films
1920s English-language films
1920s British films
Silent sports films